Suriyothai (Burmese:သူရိယထိုင်း)  was a royal queen consort during the 16th century Ayutthaya period of Siam (now Thailand). She is famous for having given up her life in the defense of her husband, King Maha Chakkraphat, in a battle during the Burmese–Siamese War (1547–1549).

Name and title 
Somdet Phra and Sri, pronounced and often transcribed Si, are her honorifics. Her given name Suriyothai   means "dawn". It is a compound of Suriya, from Sanskrit surya सूर्य "sun",  through Prakrit derived Tamil word சூரிய (Suriya); plus Uthai from udaya उदय "rising", again Prakrit derived Tamil உதய (Uthaya).

Life 
Suriyothai was married to Prince Tien when he was regent under King Yodfa's rule. Wishing to remain faithful to Suriothai, Prince Tien entered a monastery to avoid the advances of Si Sudachan, the Queen Mother.

Suriyothai was queen during the early part of the reign of King Maha Chakkraphat. In 1548 CE, barely six months into King Maha Chakkraphat's reign, the King of Burma invaded Siam with the intent of sacking the main capital, Ayutthaya.

First Burmese invasion 

The invasion initially met little resistance, as the Burmese force was too large for the small guard posts on the border. Upon hearing of the Burmese invasion, Maha Chakkraphat mobilized his kingdom, then gathered his forces at Suphanburi, a town just west of Ayutthaya. When Tabinshwehti and his Burmese army arrived at the walled town of Kanchanaburi, they found it deserted. The King of Burma then continued his march eastward, capturing the villages of Ban Thuan, Kaphan Tru and Chorakhe Sam Phan. Tabinshwehti divided his army into three columns, the first commanded by Bayinnaung, the second by the Viceroy of Prome, and the third by Yong, the Governor of Bassein. The Burmese continued their advance and captured the ancient town of Uthong as well as the villages of Don Rakhang and Nong Sarai and closed on Suphanburi. When the Burmese attacked the town, the Siamese defenders could not withstand the onslaught and retreated towards Ayutthaya. Tabinshwehti ordered his army southeast along two canals, and crossed the Chao Phraya River near Phong Phaeng. From here he encamped his army directly north of the Siamese capital of Ayutthaya on a field called the Lumpli Plain.

Maha Chakkraphat left the capital with his forces to engage Tabinshwehti and test Burmese strength. On this occasion, he mounted his chief war elephant. Accompanying him were his Chief Queen, Sri Suriyothai, and one of their young daughters, Princess Boromdhilok, the two riding together on a smaller war elephant. Both royal ladies were dressed in male military attire (helmet and armour), with the queen wearing the uniform of an Uparaja. Also accompanying their father on elephant mounts were two sons, the Uparaja and heir apparent, Prince Ramesuan, and his brother Prince Mahin.

Elephant battle and death
The Siamese army under Maha Chakkraphat soon met the advance column commanded by the Viceroy of Prome, and the two armies engaged in battle. The commanders of the two forces engaged in single elephant-combat, as was the custom of the time. Maha Chakkraphat's elephant panicked and gave flight, charging away from the enemy, the viceroy giving chase. Fearing for the life of her husband, Queen Sri Suriyothai charged ahead to put her elephant between the king and the viceroy, thereby blocking his pursuit. The viceroy then engaged the queen in single combat, fatally cleaving her from shoulder to heart with his halberd, also mortally wounding her daughter. Both mother and child met their deaths on the back of the same elephant. It was said that the viceroy did not know he was fighting a woman until his blow struck. As she fell dying, her helmet came off, exposing her long hair. Burmese chronicles do not mention any instance of single combat (on elephant-back or otherwise) by the Viceroy of Prome.

Prince Ramesuan and Prince Mahin then urged their elephants forward to fight the viceroy, and drove him and his remaining forces from the field, then carried the bodies of their mother and sister back to Ayutthaya. The Siamese king meanwhile rallied his army, and retreated in good order back towards the capital.

Children 
Phra Ramesuan – Upparat, captured and ransomed in 1549, taken as prisoner in 1564, died as a commander of the Burmese army in 1564.
Phra Mahin – later King Mahinthrathirat.
Phra Sawatdirat – became wife of Maha Thammaracha, later Queen Wisutkasat, mother of King Naresuan, King Ekathotsarot and Princess Suphankanlaya.
Phra Boromdilok – died next to her mother in battle.
Phra Thepkassatri – bride-to-be of King Setthathirath of Lan Xang, kidnapped and taken to Burma.

Legacy 

A memorial chedi to Queen Suriyothai, Phra Chedi Sisuriyothai, was built by King Maha Chakkraphat in her honor. The chedi is at Wat Suanluang Sopsawan on the banks of the Chao Phraya River, southwest of the royal palace. There is also a memorial park to her outside of Ayutthaya, featuring a large statue of the queen riding a war elephant at Tung Makham Yong in Ban Mai sub-district, Phra Nakhon Si Ayutthaya District in order to honor Queen Suriyothai and to mark the great occasion of Her Majesty Queen Sirikit’s 60th birthday anniversary in 1992.

In 2001, a Thai movie about her life, The Legend of Suriyothai, was released. The film was directed by M.C. Chatrichalerm Yukol of the Thai Royal Family and financed by Queen Sirikit.

In 2013 Opera Siam International premiered S. P. Somtow's ballet-opera called "Suriyothai" in honour of the birthday of Queen Sirikit. It starred Stacey Tappan and Winita Lohitkul, and was conducted by Trisdee na Patalung.

Notes

References

External links
 Phra Chedi Sri Suriyothai information page
 Brief History of Ayutthaya

Thai queens consort
Women in 16th-century warfare
1511 births
1548 deaths
Women in war in Southeast Asia
Female wartime cross-dressers
Military personnel killed in action
Suphannaphum dynasty
War-related deaths
Deaths by blade weapons
16th-century Thai women